Russell Aubrey "Lena" Blackburne (October 23, 1886 – February 29, 1968) was an American baseball infielder, manager, coach, and scout in Major League Baseball (MLB). He is best known for the creation of his baseball rubbing mud, used to remove the finish on new baseballs and give better grip and control to the pitcher.

Career
Between 1910 and 1929, Blackburne played for the Chicago White Sox (1910, 1912, 1914–1915, 1927, 1929), Cincinnati Reds (1918), Boston Braves (1919) and Philadelphia Phillies (1919). He batted and threw right-handed. Following his playing career, Blackburne managed the White Sox (1928–29) and coached for the White Sox (1927–28), St. Louis Browns (1930) and Philadelphia Athletics (1933–38; 1940–45; 1947–48).

Blackburne was a native of Clifton Heights, Pennsylvania, and moved to Palmyra, New Jersey with his family at a very young age. While living in Palmyra, as a youth, Blackburne played football for the Palmyra Field Club in 1906. 

Blackburne broke into the majors with the White Sox in 1910, appearing in part of five seasons, and split the 1919 season with the Braves and Phillies. In an eight-season playing career, Blackburne was a .214 hitter with four home runs and 139 runs batted in in 550 games played. As a fielder, he appeared in 539 games at shortstop (213), third base (180) and second (144) and first (2), and also relieved in one game.

In 1933, he went on to become a coach with the Philadelphia Athletics of Connie Mack. Blackburne stayed with the Athletics as a scout when the club moved to Kansas City. As a manager in the major leagues, he posted a 99–133 record for a .427 winning percentage. He managed the Toronto Maple Leafs of the International League for parts of three seasons: 1916, 1921, and 1932. In each case he was hired as a mid-season replacement.

Blackburne died in Riverside Township, New Jersey at age 81, and is buried in Morgan Cemetery on the outskirts of Palmyra, not far from where he lived on Henry and Cinnaminson Avenues.

Managerial record

See also

Chicago White Sox all-time roster
List of Major League Baseball player–managers

References

External links

Associated Press

Lena Blackburne - Baseballbiography.com
The Deadball E
Rubbing Mud story from National Public Radio
http://www.baseballrubbingmud.com

1886 births
1968 deaths
Baseball coaches from Pennsylvania
Baseball players from Pennsylvania
Boston Braves players
Chicago White Sox coaches
Chicago White Sox managers
Chicago White Sox players
Cincinnati Reds players
Kansas City Athletics scouts
Little Rock Travelers players
Major League Baseball infielders
Major League Baseball player-managers
Milwaukee Brewers (minor league) players
People from Clifton Heights, Pennsylvania
People from Palmyra, New Jersey
Philadelphia Athletics coaches
Philadelphia Phillies players
Philadelphia Athletics scouts
Providence Grays (minor league) players
St. Louis Browns coaches
Toledo Mud Hens players
Toronto Maple Leafs (International League) managers
Toronto Maple Leafs (International League) players
Worcester Busters players